The Leidsch Dagblad (Dutch: Leiden Daily) is a Dutch regional newspaper that is published since March 1, 1860. It is owned by Mediahuis Nederland and receives most editorial services from the Noordhollands Dagblad.

Distribution is quickly dwindling. In 2008, 31,439 copied were distributed in Leiden and suburbs. In 2017 distribution had fallen to 21,318 copies.

References

External links
Official website

Daily newspapers published in the Netherlands
Dutch-language newspapers
Publications established in 1860
Mass media in Leiden